K-Anthony is the stage name of Kevin Anthony Fowler, a Jamaican-Canadian contemporary Christian singer and songwriter. He received recognition with his 2020 EP The Cure, which was a Juno Award nominee for Contemporary Christian/Gospel Album of the Year at the Juno Awards of 2021. His song FREE won "Gospel Song of the YEAR" in 2022 at the 42nd Annual GMA Canada Covenant Awards

Originally from Falmouth, Jamaica, Fowler moved to Canada in the early 2010s, and is currently based in Regina, Saskatchewan.

Discography

References 

21st-century Jamaican male singers
Jamaican gospel singers
Jamaican emigrants to Canada
21st-century Black Canadian male singers
Canadian gospel singers
Musicians from Regina, Saskatchewan
People from Trelawny Parish
Living people
Year of birth missing (living people)